Soombe is a Tulu language film directed by Saikrishna Kudla starring Rahul, Shritama Mukherjee, Devadas Kapikad, Naveen D Padil, Bhojaraj Vamanjoor, Aravind Bolar, Saikrishna, Prasanna Bailoor, Sunder Rai in lead roles and Sandalwood stars Srinagar Kitty, Bullet Prakash, Vaijanath Biradar in a guest roles. Soombe is produced under the banner of Sri Yajnadhya Productions by Kishor Kottari and Shwetha K Kottari.
 The film was released on 13 Mar 2015.

Plot
Described as a film within a film, the ‘masala’ story for Soombe revolves around a Kannada producer (Vaijanath Biradar) producing a Tulu cinema. The main theme of the story revolves around a financier who is after the hero (Rahul Amin) to recover the loan given to him.
Meanwhile, the hero and heroine (Shritama Mukherjee) who are to perform as a pair in love in the film within film end up being attracted to each other in real life.

Cast 
Rahul Amin
Shritama Mukherjee
Devadas Kapikad
Naveen D Padil
Bhojaraj Vamanjoor
Aravind Bolar
Saikrishna
Prasanna Bailoor
Sunder Rai 
Srinagar Kitty
Bullet Prakash
Vaijanath Biradar

References